Cats and Dogs is the fourth studio album by Royal Trux. It was released in 1993 on Drag City.

Track listing

Personnel
Credits adapted from liner notes.
 Jennifer Herrema – vocals
 Neil Hagerty – guitar
 Mike Kaiser – guitar 
 Ian Willers – drums
 Brian Smith – percussion

References

External links
 

1993 albums
Royal Trux albums
Drag City (record label) albums
Domino Recording Company albums